The Corona Ottomana (also called the San Salvador) was an Ottoman galley ship known for being the site of a slave revolt by Christian slaves in 1760.

Slave uprising 
On 2 June 1760 the Corona Ottomana left Constantinople with 750 men on board, including 71 Christian slaves. Its mission was to collect taxes from the Levant on behalf of the Ottoman Treasury.  

The slaves captured the ship whilst the other men were on land collecting taxes. Led by Giovanni del Core, they sailed the ship to Malta.  

Once in Malta the ship was renamed the San Salvador, and added to the squadron of the Knights Hospitallers. 

After the Turkish Sultan threatened to invade Malta, the Knights Hospitallers agreed to return the ship to the Ottoman Porte in return for a large indemnity. The ship returned to Constantinople in 1762.

See also
Lupa (ship)

References

Galleys
Age of Sail naval ships of the Ottoman Empire
Navy of the Order of Saint John
Slave rebellions in Europe
Captured ships
Maritime incidents in 1760
1760s in Malta
Slavery in the Ottoman Empire
18th-century ships